Tipperary Town is a town and a civil parish in County Tipperary, Ireland. Its population was 4,979 at the 2016 census. It is also an ecclesiastical parish in the Roman Catholic Archdiocese of Cashel and Emly, and is in the historical barony of Clanwilliam. The town gave its name to County Tipperary.

History

In Irish, "Tiobraid Árann" means "The Well of Ara"—a reference to the River Ara that flows through the town. The well is located in the townland of Glenbane, which is in the parish of Lattin and Cullen. This is where the River Ara rises. Little is known of the historical significance of the well.

The town had a medieval foundation and became a population centre in the early 13th century. Its ancient fortifications have disappeared, often dismantled to be reused in new buildings. Its central area is characterized by wide streets radiating from the principal thoroughfare of Main Street.

Two historical monuments are located in the Main Street. One is a bronze statue of Charles Kickham (poet and patriot). The other is the Maid of Erin statue, erected to commemorate the Irish patriots, Allen, Larkin and O'Brien, who are collectively known as the Manchester Martyrs. The Maid of Erin is a freestanding monument; erected in 1907, it was relocated to a corner site on the main street in 2003. It is made of carved limestone. A woman stands on a base depicting the portraits of the three executed men. The portraits carry the names in Irish of each man. The statue is now situated on stone-flagged pavement behind wrought-iron railings, with an information board. This memorial to the Manchester Martyrs is a landmark piece of sculpture now located in a prominent corner site. The choice of a female figure as the personification of Ireland for such a memorial was common at the time. It is a naturalistic and evocative piece of work, made all the more striking by the lifelike portraits of the executed men.

The first engagement of the Irish War of Independence took place at nearby Solloghead Beg Quarry on 21 January 1919 when Dan Breen and Seán Treacy led a group of volunteers in an attack on members of the Royal Irish Constabulary who were transporting gelignite.

The town was the site of a large military barracks of the British Army in the 50 years before Irish Independence and served as a military hospital during World War I. During the War of Independence, these barracks were a base for the Black and Tans.

On 30 September 2005, Mary McAleese, President of Ireland, in a gesture of reconciliation, unveiled the newly refurbished Memorial Arch of the barracks in the presence of several ambassadors and foreign emissaries, military attachés and town dignitaries; a detachment of the Local Defence Force, the Number 1 Irish Army Band and various ex-service organisations paraded. In a rare appearance, the Royal Munster Fusiliers banner was carried to mark the occasion.

However, given the notoriety of the place in the folk memory, few townspeople attended. The Arch is the only remaining porch of what was the officers' mess and has panels mounted bearing the names of fallen members of the Irish Defence Forces (on United Nations service), and American, Australian, and United Kingdom armed services.
 The Arch was renovated and maintained by the Tipperary Remembrance Trust.

New Tipperary 

In 1888–89, tenants of the local landlord, Arthur Smith Barry, withheld their rents in solidarity with his tenants in County Cork. They were evicted. Led by Fr. David Humphreys and William O'Brien, they decided to build a new town on land outside Barry's control. The area now known Dillon Street and Emmet Street in Tipperary town was the centre of this development. It was built by local labour but with funds raised in Australia and the United States.

The high point was 12 April 1890, when a row of shops called the William O'Brien Arcade was opened, providing shops for some of the business people who had been evicted from the centre of the town. Eventually, compromise was reached, and the tenants returned to the 'Old Tipperary'.

Transportation

Roads 
The town is situated on the N24 route between Limerick city and Waterford city.

Railway access 
Tipperary railway station is on the Limerick to Waterford line and has two services a day to Waterford via Cahir, Clonmel and Carrick on Suir. Two trains a day also operate to Limerick Junction which has numerous services to Cork, Dublin Heuston and Limerick and onward connections to Ennis, Athenry and Galway. There is no train service to/from Tipperary on Sundays. Tipperary railway station opened 9 May 1848.

Amenities
It is home to Tipperary Racecourse, which is located at Limerick Junction.  It has a large agricultural catchment area in west Tipperary and east County Limerick and was historically a significant market town. Today, it still boasts large butter making and milk processing industries. The town is sometimes erroneously believed to be the county seat; this honour belongs instead to Clonmel.

Notable people
 Peter Campbell (naval officer), founder of the Uruguayan navy.
 Kerry Condon, actress.
 Dr. Liam Hennessy, exercise physiologist, strength and conditioning coach, and former international athlete.
 Mick Kinane, jockey.
 Shane Long, Irish international and Premier League football player played for St. Michael's.
 Michael F. O'Connell, member of the Wisconsin State Assembly.
 Alan Quinlan, the Munster Rugby player was born in Tipperary in 1974.
 George Roupell, Victoria Cross recipient.
 Laurence Sterne, novelist.
 George Thomas (soldier), the Raja from Tiperary, Irish adventurer who established an independent kingdom at Hansi in India.
 John Walsh, soldier in the Union Army during the American Civil War, earning the Medal of Honor.
 The Two Johnnies, Comedians, Radio Producers and Singers.

Tipperary International Peace Award
Created by locals in an attempt to counter the association between Tipperary and war created by the song It's a long way to Tipperary, the Tipperary International Peace Award, described as "Ireland's outstanding award for humanitarian work", has been awarded annually by the Tipperary Peace Convention since the inaugural award to the late Seán MacBride in 1984. Among the other recipients are Live Aid founder Bob Geldof for 1985, the late Irish senator and peace campaigner Gordon Wilson for 1987, former Soviet General Secretary Mikhail Gorbachev for 1988, the late South African president Nelson Mandela for 1989, former US president Bill Clinton for 2000, former New York mayor Rudy Giuliani for 2001, John O’Shea, founder of the charity Goal for 2003, the late Pakistani president Benazir Bhutto for 2007, the late US Senator Edward Kennedy for 2009, Afghan human rights campaigner Dr Sima Samar for 2010, former Irish president, Mary McAleese and her husband, senator Martin McAleese for 2011, Pakistani activist for female education and youngest-ever Nobel Prize laureate Malala Yousafzai for 2012, former US envoy to Northern Ireland Richard Haass for 2013, the former UN Secretary General Ban Ki-moon for 2014, and Colombian president Juan Manuel Santos for 2017.

Twin towns
 
  Mautern in Steiermark, Austria (since 2006)
  Parthenay, France

In song
The song "It's a Long Way to Tipperary", which became popular among the British military as a marching song, was authored by Jack Judge, whose grandparents came from Tipperary, and Henry James "Harry" Williams.

The U.S. Army included a song by John Alden Carpenter called "The Home Road" in its official 1918 song book; it includes the lyric "For the long, long road to Tipperary is the road that leads me home". A song of remembrance is "Tipperary so far away", which commemorates one of its famous sons, Seán Treacy; in an address to the people of Ballyporeen on 3 June 1984, Ronald Reagan, President of the United States of America, quoted a line from this song: "And I'll never more roam, from my own native home, in Tipperary so far away". There are other songs also with a Tipperary theme such as "Tipperary on My Mind", "Slievenamon", "Goodbye Mick", "The Galtee Mountain Boy", "Katy Daly" (an American song), "Tipperary", and "Forty Shades of Green", written by Johnny Cash.

Gary Moore's song "Business as Usual" tells about him and his love: "I lost my virginity to a Tipperary woman".  On Seventy Six The Band's 2006 release Gone Is Winter, the song "Carry On" also states that it is "a long way to Tipperary". Shane MacGowan's song "Broad Majestic Shannon" includes the lyric "Heard the men coming home from the fair at Shinrone, their hearts in Tipperary wherever they go".

See also
 List of towns and villages in Ireland

References

 David J. Butler (2006). South Tipperary 1570–1841: Religion, Land and Rivalry.
 Denis G. Marnane (1985). A History of West Tipperary from 1660: Land and Violence.
 William Nolan & Thomas G. McGrath (1985). Tipperary History & Society.
 Martin O'Dwyer (2001). Tipperary's Sons & Daughters - Biographies of Tipperary Persons Involved in the National Struggle.
 Walter S. O'Shea (1998). A Short History of Tipperary Military Barracks (Infantry) 1874–1922.

External links

 Tipperary Town

 
Towns and villages in County Tipperary
Civil parishes of Clanwilliam, County Tipperary
Parishes of the Roman Catholic Archdiocese of Cashel and Emly